Pyne Glacier is a glacier east of Robson Glacier in the Gonville and Caius Range. It flows north and joins the Mackay Glacier system southwest of The Flatiron. Named after Alex Pyne, recipient of the Polar Medal for services in Antarctic geological and in particular glacial research since 1977; as of January 2000 he works at Victoria University's Antarctic Research Centre in Wellington.

References

Glaciers of Victoria Land
Scott Coast